The University of Makati Stadium, simply known as the UMak, is a football and track field stadium built and owned by the University of Makati.

Background
The stadium has hosted United Football League games as well as a friendly match of the Philippines national football team. It also has hosted the National Capital Region F.A. Division 3 League.

The stadium was assigned as the training ground of the Thailand national football team during the group stage of the 2016 AFF Championship. The Thai head coach criticized the hosts for the poor quality of the pitch before their very first game of the tournament and the long grass in the pitch had to be trimmed before the Thais began their training session.

Kaya F.C.–Makati, who were set to participate in the inaugural edition of the Philippines Football League, announced in January 2017 that they have made the stadium as their home ground. However the following season, they moved to Iloilo.

Facilities
UMak has a grandstand, light towers, and a rubberized track. However the stadium has a reputation for a poor quality pitch. It is reported in 2012 that the football venue has no basic herringbone drainage system and the soil is garden-variety soil which fails FIFA standards of six layers of six layers of sand, soil and topsoil. The Philippine Rugby Football Union offered to install a drainage system for free but the offer was not accepted. 
By October 2018, the football field's surface has been converted to artificial grass. In 2019, an artificial pitch was installed in the stadium.

References 

Sports venues in Metro Manila
Educational structures in Metro Manila
Athletics (track and field) venues in the Philippines
Football venues in the Philippines
Art Deco architecture in the Philippines
Buildings and structures in Makati
University sports venues in the Philippines